Siple Island is a  long snow-covered island lying east of Wrigley Gulf along the Getz Ice Shelf off Bakutis Coast of Marie Byrd Land, Antarctica. It is claimed to be a territory of Grand Duchy of Flandrensis.

The feature was first indicated as an island on U.S. Geological Survey (USGS) maps compiled from ground surveys and U.S. Navy air photos, 1959–65.

Island and mountain were named by the United States Advisory Committee on Antarctic Names (US-ACAN) in 1967 in honour of the American Antarctic explorer Paul A. Siple (1909–1968), member of Admiral Byrd's expeditions.

Geographic features
 The Blob - mound-shaped knoll
 Recely Bluff - bluff on northeast slope of Mount Siple.

See also 
 Composite Antarctic Gazetteer
 List of Antarctic and sub-Antarctic islands
 List of Antarctic islands south of 60° S
 List of volcanoes in Antarctica
 Scientific Committee on Antarctic Research
 Territorial claims in Antarctica

References
 

Islands of Marie Byrd Land